Sipahijala District is a district of Tripura, India. This district was created in January 2012 when four new districts were established in Tripura, taking the number of districts in the state from four to eight. Part of the district was formed from the former district of West Tripura. The principal towns in the district are Bishalgarh, Bishramganj, Melaghar and Sonamura.

Division
There are 3 Sub-Division in Sipahijala district. They are Bishalgarh subdivision, Sonamura Sub-division and Jampuijala subdivision.

There are 7 Blocks under Sepahijala District. They are Bishalgarh, Charilam, Nalchar (formerly Melaghar), Mohanbhog, Boxanagar, Kathalia and Jampuijala

Demographics 
According to the 2011 census, Sipahijala district had a population of 479,975. Khowai has a sex ratio of 955 females to 1000 males and a literacy rate of 84.78%. 10.28% of the population lives in urban areas. Scheduled Castes and Scheduled Tribes make up 82,557 (17.20%) and 115,811 (24.13%) of the population respectively.

Khowai had 349,260 Hindus, 118,038 Muslims and 11,399 Christians.

At the time of the 2011 census, 73.26% of the population spoke Bengali and 23.32% Kokborok as their first language.

Transport

Roadway
National Highway 8 (NH 8), running from Karimganj in Assam to Sabroom in Tripura, passes through this district.

Railway
Lumding–Sabroom line of Northeast Frontier Railway passes through Sipahijala district. There are two stations in the district,
namely Bishramganj railway station and Bishalgarh railway station, providing connectivity to Tripura capital Agartala and Assam and other major cities of the state like Dharmanagar, Udaipur and Belonia.

Places to visit
There are mainly 3(Three) tourist spots in Sepahijala District which are namely:-

1. Neermahal2. Sipahijola Wildlife Sanctuary3. Kamalasagar and Kamalasagar(Kashaba) Kali Temple

References

External links
 Official website

 
Districts of Tripura